Charles Asten (born Michael Charles Asten, but served under his middle name) (September 14, 1834 – September 14, 1885) was a Quarter Gunner in the United States Navy during the American Civil War. Asten was born in Halifax, Nova Scotia, in September 1834, and he entered the United States Navy in Chicago, Illinois, during the Civil War.  In 1864, he served aboard , a U.S. tinclad, during the Red River Campaign.

Signal incident
On May 4, 1864,  was ordered to proceed up the Red River with a bearer of dispatches from Major General Nathaniel Prentice Banks, the commander of the Union Red River Campaign forces. On May 5, Signal was disabled and the crew, including Asten, reluctantly abandoned the ship; having surrendered, they were captured on land.

Aftermath
Asten, who had, on May 5, carried out his duties despite being on the sick list, was awarded the Medal of Honor on December 31, 1864. George Butts, and six other fellow Signal crew members, also received Medals of Honor for their valor during the action.

Charles Asten died on September 14, 1885, in Nova Scotia. He was interred at Saint Francis Cemetery in Providence County, Rhode Island.

Full citation
Aster's Medal of Honor citation reads as follows:

Served on board the U.S.S. Signal, Red River, 5 May 1864. Proceeding up the Red River, the U.S.S. Signal engaged a large force of enemy field batteries and sharpshooters, returning their fire until the Federal ship was totally disabled, at which time the white flag was raised. Although on the sick list, Q.G. Asten courageously carried out his duties during the entire engagement.

See also

 List of American Civil War Medal of Honor recipients

References

External links
 Congressional Medal of Honor Society page

1834 births
1885 deaths
Union Navy sailors
People from Halifax, Nova Scotia
United States Army Medal of Honor recipients
Canadian-born Medal of Honor recipients
Pre-Confederation Canadian emigrants to the United States
American Civil War recipients of the Medal of Honor